Government of Mariano Rajoy may refer to:

First government of Mariano Rajoy (2011–2016)
Second government of Mariano Rajoy (2016–2018)